Willie Benegas is an Argentinian-American mountain climber. He has been climbing for over 25 years and has climbed Mount Everest and Aconcagua 12 times and also climbed many volcanos in Guatemala. He is from Argentina, but now lives in Utah. In 2005, while working as a Mountain Madness guide, he was noted as being well liked and respected at EBC, and being quick to help others. He has also climbed Himalayan mountains Manaslu, Cho Oyu and Makalu. In an interview with one Everest climber, he recounted how Benegas went into the "dead bodies tent" to save the life a man others had given up on. That is to say they expected him to die due to various injuries and had fluid coming out of his mouth; however, Benegas managed to make an airway and rallied a group of Sherpas to carry him down. Within the hour they had gotten him down and helicopter evacuated out the next day during the 2015 Mount Everest avalanches.

Everest summits: (13 times)
1999
2001
2002
2004
2005
2007x2
2008
2009
2010
2012
2017
2018

See also
List of Mount Everest summiters by number of times to the summit
List of 20th-century summiters of Mount Everest

References

External links
Everesthistory : Willie Benegas

American mountain climbers
American summiters of Mount Everest
Year of birth missing (living people)
Living people